A figurine (a diminutive form of the word figure) or statuette is a small, three-dimensional sculpture that represents a human, deity or animal, or, in practice, a pair or small group of them. Figurines have been made in many media, with clay, metal, wood, glass, and today plastic or resin the most significant. Ceramic figurines not made of porcelain are called terracottas in historical contexts.

Figures with movable parts, allowing limbs to be posed, are more likely to be called dolls, mannequins, or action figures; or robots or automata, if they can move on their own. Figurines and miniatures are sometimes used in board games, such as chess, and tabletop role playing games.

The main difference between a figurine and a statue is size.

Prehistory

In China, there are extant Neolithic figurines.

European prehistoric figurines of women, some appearing pregnant, are called Venus figurines, because of their presumed connection to fertility. The two oldest known examples are made of stone, were found in Africa and Asia, and are several hundred thousand years old. Many made of fired clay have been found in Europe that date to 25–30,000 BC, and are the oldest ceramics known.

Olmec figurines in semi-precious stones and pottery had a wide influence all over Mesoamerica about 1000–500 BC, and were apparently usually kept in houses.

These early figurines are among the first signs of human culture. One cannot know in some cases how they were used. They probably had religious or ceremonial significance and may have been used in many types of rituals. Many are found in burials. Some may have been worn as jewelry or intended to amuse children.

History
    
Porcelain and other ceramics are common materials for figurines. Ancient Greek terracotta figurines, made in moulds, were a large industry by the Hellenistic period, and ones in bronze also very common. In Roman art bronze came to predominate. Most of these were religious, and deposited in large numbers in temples as votives, or kept in the home and sometimes buried with their owner. But types such as Tanagra figurines included many purely decorative subjects, such as fashionable ladies. There are many early examples from China, mainly religious figures in Dehua porcelain, which drove the experimentation in Europe to replicate the process. 

The first European porcelain figurines, were produced in Meissen porcelain, initially in a plain glazed white, but soon brightly painted in overglaze "enamels", and were soon produced by nearly all European porcelain factories.  The initial function of these seems to have been as permanent versions of sugar sculptures which were used to decorate tables on special occasions by European elites, but they soon found a place on mantelpieces and side tables. There was already some production of earthenware figures in English delftware and stoneware, for example by John Dwight of the Fulham Pottery in London, and after 1720 such figures became more popular.  By around 1750 pottery figures were being produced in large numbers all over Europe. Staffordshire figures were cheaper versions in earthenware, and by the late 19th century especially noted for Staffordshire dog figurines.

Genre figurines of gallant scenes, beggars or figurines of saints are carved from pinewood in Val Gardena, South Tyrol (Italy), since the 17th century.

Significant types:
Ushabti - Ancient Egypt, mostly placed in tombs 
Olmec figurine
Psi and phi type figurine - Mycenaean Greece
Euphrates Syrian Pillar Figurines and Horses and Riders - Iron Age
Tanagra figurines - Hellenistic Greece
Tang dynasty tomb figures - China, c. 620-755
Mississippian stone statuary - c. 800-1600
Staffordshire figures - England, 1720 to present
Santons - Provence, France, 18th century to present
Animal figurines
Model figure

Modern era
Modern figurines, particularly those made of plastic, are often referred to as figures. They can encompass modern action figures and other model figures as well as Precious Moments figurines and Hummel figurines, Bobbleheads, Sebastian Miniatures and other kinds of memorabilia. Some companies which produce porcelain figurines are Royal Doulton, Lladró and Camal Enterprises.

Figurines of comic book or sci-fi/fantasy characters without movable parts have been referred to by the terms inaction figures (originally used to describe Kevin Smith's View Askew figurines) and staction figures (a portmanteau of statue and action figures coined by Four Horsemen artists to describe Masters of the Universe figures). Also Amiibo is a line of plastic figurines with NFC tags embedded to its base that can be used in order to interact with certain videogames for Nintendo consoles.

There is also a hobby known as mini war gaming in which players use figurines (for example toy soldiers) in table top based games. These figurines are mostly made of plastic and pewter. However, some premium models are made of resin.

Figurines can also represent racial and ethnic slurs, for example, Jew with a coin figurines, and Mammy figurines.

Gallery
For more images related for "Figurine", see Category:Figurines on Commons

References

Figurines
Statues
Types of sculpture
 
Toy collecting